Muchamad Aqil Savik (born, 17 January 1999 in Bandung) is an Indonesian professional footballer who plays as a goalkeeper for Liga 1 club Bhayangkara.

Club career

Persib Bandung
Savik went through the youth system of his hometown club Persib Bandung before joining the senior squad in 2018. He professionally debuted in the 2019 Liga 1 season. Due to a surplus of experienced goalkeepers, Persib in 2020 loaned him to feeder club Bandung United in Liga 3.

Bhayangkara
Savik was signed for Bhayangkara to play in Liga 1 in the 2022–23 season. He made his league debut on 8 December 2022 in a match against Bali United at the Manahan Stadium, Surakarta.

International career
Savik represented the Indonesia U-18 team in the 2017 AFF U-18 Youth Championship and Indonesia U-19 in the 2018 AFC U-19 Championship.
He received his first call to join the senior Indonesia national football team in May 2021.

Career statistics

Club

Notes

Honours

International 
Indonesia U-19
 AFF U-19 Youth Championship third place: 2017, 2018

References

External links
Aqil Savik at Soccerway
Aqil Savik at Liga-Indonesia

1999 births
Living people
Indonesian footballers
People from Bandung
Persib Bandung players
Bandung United F.C. players
Bhayangkara F.C. players
Liga 1 (Indonesia) players
Indonesia youth international footballers
Association football goalkeepers
Sportspeople from West Java